James Maxwell McQueen (16 January 1915 – 22 February 1972) was an Australian rules footballer who played with Hawthorn in the Victorian Football League (VFL).

Family
The son of Hugh McQueen (1867–1948) and Minnie Agnes McQueen (1876–1950), née Rae, James Maxwell McQueen was born at Rochester on 16 January 1915.

Football
McQueen first trained with Hawthorn before the 1937 season, being identified as a follower from Kyabram who may provide support to Bert Mills and Bill Ford. He played well in practice matches and earned a place in Hawthorn's Round 1 team that defeated North Melbourne by two points, but his performance was described as "not inspiring". He was dropped to the reserves and shortly afterwards returned to Kyabram.

Notes

External links 

1915 births
1972 deaths
Australian rules footballers from Victoria (Australia)
Hawthorn Football Club players